Yorosso Cercle is an administrative subdivision of the Sikasso Region of southern Mali. The main town (chef-lieu) is Yorosso.

The cercle is divided into nine rural communes:

Boura
Karangana
Kiffosso I
Koumbia
Koury
Mahou
Ménamba I
Ourikéla
Yorosso

References

Cercles of Mali
Sikasso Region